Malekan (Romanized as Malekān; formerly, Malik Kandi (ترکی آذربایجانی: مَلِك كَندی), also Romanized as Malek Kandī and Malikkand) is a city in the Central District of Malekan County, East Azerbaijan province, Iran, and serves as capital of the county. At the 2006 census, its population was 23,989 in 6,356 households. The following census in 2011 counted 25,312 people in 7,284 households. The latest census in 2016 showed a population of 27,431 people in 8,467 households.

References 

Malekan County

Cities in East Azerbaijan Province

Populated places in East Azerbaijan Province

Populated places in Malekan County